Munc-13 (an acronym for mammalian uncoordinated-13) is a protein which complexes with RIM and likely comprises part of cellular structure which anchors synaptic vesicles. Its activation by DAG seems to be important for maintaining high rate of synaptic release during prolonged repetitive stimulation.

References 

Proteins
Secretory vesicles
Neurophysiology